Ostrum Asset Management (Ostrum AM), previously Natixis Asset Management, is a France-based asset manager, founded in 2007. It is part of Groupe BPCE, a banking group in France. Ostrum AM is an affiliate of Natixis Investment Managers (previously Natixis Global Asset Management), majority owned by BPCE.

At the end of December 2017, Ostrum AM held €324.5 billion ($400 billion) in assets and was employing over 700 people.

History 
1984 - 2006 : Founding

 1985 : Establishment of one of the first solidarity funds : Nord Sud Développement, which became Natixis Impact Nord Sud Développement later on.
 2001 : CDC Asset Management becomes CDC IXIS Asset Management.
 2004 : CDC IXIS Asset Management becomes IXIS Asset Management, fully owned by IXIS Asset Management Group.
 2006 : Founding of Natixis : The result of aligning activities by both the Groupe Caisse d’Epargne and Groupe Banque Populaire.

2007 - 2017 : Natixis Asset Management

 2013 : Launch of Natixis Global Risk Parity, a global allocation fund with a balanced risk approach.
 2014 : Launch of Natixis Short Term Global High Income Fund.
 2016 : Natixis Asset Management launched Real Assets Private Debt management in three sectors : real estate, infrastructure and aircraft.

2018 : Ostrum Asset Management

In 2018, Natixis Asset Management was renamed Ostrum Asset Management. Natixis Asset Management U.S. and Natixis Asset Management Asia were also renamed Ostrum Asset Management U.S. and Ostrum Asset Management Asia Limited by June 2018.

Operations 
Ostrum AM is present in Europe, Asia and in the United States. Natixis Asset Management Asia, which manages Asian assets.

Ostrum AM’s clients are institutions, individuals and distributors.

Controversies 
The AMF Enforcement Committee, part of the Autorité des Marchés Financier (AMF:French stock market regulator), fined Natixis Asset Management for overcharging investors with its formula funds. The ruling was handed down on 25 July 2017 and the AMF fined the company €35 million.

References 

Financial management organizations